Claire Chase (born 1978) is a soloist, collaborative artist, curator and advocate for new and experimental music. Chase has won the Avery Fisher Prize, which recognizes musical excellence, vision, and leadership. In 2012, Chase was awarded a MacArthur Fellowship—the so-called "genius" award.

Early life and education
Chase was born in 1978 and grew up in Leucadia, California. She made her solo debut with the San Diego Symphony at age 14 in 1992.

While attending Oberlin College,  where she studied with Michel Debost, she received the Theodore Presser Foundation Award in 1999 which she used to commission new compositions for the flute. She received her B.M. from Oberlin in 2001.

Career
After graduating from Oberlin, Chase founded the International Contemporary Ensemble (ICE) in 2001, and was its Executive/Artistic Director until 2017. ICE established musical innovation as central to the recipe not only for cultural survival, but also for popular success, with its flexible entrepreneurial structure and inclusive educational mission. Chase recently stepped down from the leadership of ICE to focus on her performing career and to make way for other long-term projects, including “Density 2036.”

After winning first prize in the Concert Artists Guild competition in 2008, she made her Carnegie Hall debut in 2010 at the Weill Recital Hall.

So far, Chase has premiered over 100 new solo works for the flute, incorporating extended techniques and electro-acoustic elements. Her first solo album, Aliento was released in 2009 and was one of Time Out Chicago's Top 10 Classical Albums of 2009. Chase has performed world-wide as a soloist and chamber musician in diverse venues including (Le) Poisson Rouge, Miller Theatre, and Lincoln Center for the Performing Arts in New York City, the John F. Kennedy Center for the Performing Arts in Washington D.C.,  the Isabella Stewart Gardner Museum in Boston, the Sibelius Academy in Helsinki, the Palacio de Bellas Artes in Mexico City, and other venues throughout Europe.

Over the past decade Claire Chase has given the world premieres of hundreds of new works for the flute in performances throughout the Americas, Europe, and Asia, and she has championed new music throughout the world by building organizations, forming alliances, pioneering commissioning initiatives, and supporting educational programs that reach new audiences.

She began "Density 2036" in 2014, a 22-year project to commission a significant body of new music for the flute, culminating in the one-hundredth anniversary of Edgard Varèse's "Density 21.5" of 1936. She is also working on Pan, a new 90-minute work for solo flutist, live electronics, and a large ensemble of players from the community in which it is performed.

Beginning in the fall of 2017 Chase has been appointed as Professor of the Practice in the Music Department at Harvard University.

Chase will hold the 2022–23 Richard and Barbara Debs Composer's Chair at Carnegie Hall.

Discography
Density 2036: parts v 2017-2018  (2020, Corbett vs. Dempsey Records)
Density 2036: parts iv 2016 (2020, Corbett vs. Dempsey Records)
Density 2036: parts iii 2015 (2020, Corbett vs. Dempsey Records)
Density 2036: parts i & ii 2013-2104 (2020, Corbett vs. Dempsey Records)
Density (2013, New Focus Recordings)
Terrestre (2012, New Focus Recordings)
Died in the Wool (2011, Samadhi Sound)
Bright and Hollow Sky (2011, New Focus Recordings)
Undersong (2011, Mode Records)
Aliento (2009, New Focus Recordings)
Enter Houses Of (2009, Tzadik Records)
Complete Crumb Edition, Vol. 12 (2008, Bridge Records)
With John Zorn
On the Torment of Saints, the Casting of Spells and the Evocation of Spirits (Tzadik, 2013)
Fragmentations, Prayers and Interjections (Tzadik, 2014)

Awards
2017 Avery Fisher Prize
2012 MacArthur Fellowship
2010 Carlos Surinach Prize
2008 First Prize Concert Artists Guild Competition
2001 First Prize National Young Artist Competition
1999 Theodore Presser Foundation Award
1996 Presidential Scholar Award from the National Foundation for Advancement in the Arts
1995 First Prize California Young Artists Competition

References

External links
Claire Chase's Website
ICE Website

American classical flautists
Oberlin Conservatory of Music alumni
MacArthur Fellows
1978 births
Living people
People from Encinitas, California
Musicians from California
20th-century American musicians
20th-century classical musicians
21st-century American musicians
21st-century classical musicians
Women flautists
20th-century American women musicians
21st-century American women musicians
20th-century flautists
21st-century flautists